Jacek Cyzio (born 6 September 1968 in Poland) is a Polish retired footballer.

Honours

Club
Trabzonspor
Turkish Cup: 1991–92

References

Polish footballers
Living people
1968 births
Association football forwards
Pogoń Szczecin players
Zagłębie Lubin players
Legia Warsaw players
Karşıyaka S.K. footballers
Trabzonspor footballers
People from Chrzanów
Polish football managers